Akwa Group S.A. (former name: Groupe Afriquia) is a conglomerate company headquartered in Casablanca. The company is primarily engaged in the oil and gas industry, but operates also in the telecommunication, tourism, hotels and real estate sectors. Its service stations operate under the Afriquia brand.

History

The company was established in 1959 as Afriquia SMDC (Société Marocaine de Distribution de Carburants) which is now a subsidiary of Akwa Group S.A.  The other major subsidiary, Maghreb Oxygène, was established in 1974. The corporate structure was reorganized in 1990s by creation of the holding company Groupe Afriquia.  Its subsidiaries Afriquia Gaz and Maghreb Oxygène were publicly listed in 1999.  Groupe Afriquia changed its name to Akwa Group in March 2002.

Afriquia fuel stations were targeted in the 2018 Boycott in Morocco.

References

External links

 

1959 establishments in Morocco
Conglomerate companies established in 1959
Conglomerate companies of Morocco
Convenience stores of Morocco
Oil and gas companies of Morocco
Companies based in Casablanca